Herbert Parsons (21 May 1875 – 20 December 1937) was an Australian cricketer. He played five first-class cricket matches for Victoria between 1909 and 1911.

See also
 List of Victoria first-class cricketers

References

External links
 

1875 births
1937 deaths
Australian cricketers
Victoria cricketers
Cricketers from Melbourne